The 1963 College Football All-America team is composed of college football players who were selected as All-Americans by various organizations and writers that chose College Football All-America Teams in 1963. The seven selectors recognized by the NCAA as "official" for the 1963 season are (1) the American Football Coaches Association (AFCA), (2) the Associated Press (AP), (3) the Central Press Association (CP), (4) the Football Writers Association of America (FWAA), (5) the Newspaper Enterprise Association (NEA), (6) the Sporting News, and (7) the United Press International (UPI).

Consensus All-Americans
For the year 1963, the NCAA recognizes seven published All-American teams as "official" designations for purposes of its consensus determinations. Four players were unanimously chosen as first-team All-Americans by all seven official selectors.  They were: (1) Navy quarterback Roger Staubach, who was awarded the 1963 Heisman Trophy; (2) Illinois center/linebacker Dick Butkus, won the 1963 Chicago Tribune Silver Football as the Big Ten Conference's Most Valuable Player; (3) tackle Scott Appleton who won the Outland Trophy and led the 1963 Texas Longhorns football team to a national championship; and (4) Nebraska guard Bob "The Boomer" Brown, who was the second player chosen in the 1964 NFL Draft.  Staubach, Butkus and Brown were each subsequently inducted into both the College and Pro Football Hall of Fames. The consensus All-American team also included College and Pro Football Hall of Fame inductees Gale Sayers (running back, Kansas) and Carl Eller (tackle, Minnesota).

The following chart identifies the NCAA-recognized consensus All-Americans and displays which first-team designations they received.

Offense

Ends
Vern Burke, Oregon State (AFCA-1, FWAA, NEA-2, UPI-1, CP, FN, WC)
Larry Elkins, Baylor (NEA-1, SN, CP, UPI-2, FN, WC)
Bob Lacey, North Carolina (AP-1, FWAA, NEA-2, FN)
Billy Martin, Georgia Tech (Time, NEA-1, SN, UPI-2, FN)
Jim Kelly, Notre Dame (AFCA-1, UPI-1)
Dave Parks, Texas Tech (AP-1, SN)
 Charles Brooks, Memphis State (FN)
 Billy Truax, LSU (FN)
Hal Bedsole, USC (Time)
Mel Profit, UCLA (AFCA-2, AP-2, NEA-3, UPI-3)
John Simmons, Tulsa (AFCA-2, UPI-3)
Don Montgomery, North Carolina St. (AP-2)
Allen Brown, Ole Miss (NEA-3)

Tackles
Scott Appleton, Texas (AFCA-1, AP-1, FWAA, NEA-1, SN, UPI-1, CP, WC, FN, Time)
Carl Eller, Minnesota (AFCA-1, AP-1, FWAA, NEA-3, UPI-1, CP, WC, FN, Time)
Ernie Borghetti, Pittsburgh  (AP-2, FWAA, NEA-3, FN)
Harry Schuh, Memphis State (NEA-1)
Ken Kortas, Louisville (FWAA)
Whaley Hall, Ole Miss (AFCA-2, UPI-2)
Ralph Neely, Oklahoma (AFCA-2, AP-2, UPI-2, FN)
Archie Sutton, Illinois (NEA-2, UPI-3)
Jim Freeman, Navy (NEA-2, FN)
 Al Hillebrand, Stanford (FN)

Guards
Bob Brown, Nebraska (AFCA-1, AP-1, FWAA, NEA-1, SN, UPI-1, CP, WC, FN, Time)
Rick Redman, Washington (AFCA-1, FWAA, NEA-1, SN, UPI-1, CP, FN, WC)
Herschel Turner, Kentucky (SN, UPI-3 [tackle], Time)
Damon Bame, USC (AP-1, NEA-3, UPI-2)
Steve DeLong, Tennessee (AFCA-2, FWAA, UPI-3, FN)
Mike Reilly, Iowa (AP-2, FWAA)
Dick Nowak, Army (AFCA-2, UPI-2, FN)
Bob Lehman, Notre Dame (AP-2)
Ed Adamchik, Pittsburgh (NEA-2)
Bill Budness, Boston Univ. (NEA-2)
Don Croftcheck, Indiana (NEA-3)
Earl Lattimer, Michigan State (UPI-3, FN)
 Robbie Hucklebridge, LSU (FN)

Centers
Dick Butkus, Illinois (AFCA-1, AP-1, FWAA, NEA-1, SN, UPI-1, CP, WC, FN, Time)
Kenny Dill, Mississippi  (AP-2, FWAA, FN)
 Ronnie Caveness, Arkansas (FN)
Malcolm Walker, Rice (NEA-2, UPI-3)
Ray Kubala, Texas A&M (AFCA-2)
Pat Watson, Mississippi State (UPI-2)
Orville Hudson, East Texas St. (NEA-3)

Quarterbacks
Roger Staubach, Navy (AFCA-1, AP-1, FWAA, NEA-1, SN, UPI-1, CP, WC, FN, Time)
Billy Lothridge, Georgia Tech (AP-1, FWAA, UPI-2, FN [halfback])
Don Trull, Baylor (AFCA-2, AP-2, FWAA, NEA-2, UPI-2, FN)
 Jimmy Sidle, Auburn (FN)
George Mira, Miami (AP-2)
Gary Wood, Cornell (NEA-2)

Backs
Sherman Lewis, Michigan State (AP-1, CP, NEA-3, UPI-1, FN, WC)
Paul Martha, Pittsburgh (AFCA-2, CP, NEA-1, SN, UPI-2, FN)
Gale Sayers, Kansas (AFCA-1, AP-2, FWAA, NEA-1, SN, UPI-1, FN, WC)
Jay Wilkinson, Duke (AFCA-1, AP-2, FWAA, NEA-3, UPI-1, FN)
Jimmy Sidle, Auburn (AP-1, FWAA, NEA-3 [qb], UPI-3)
Mel Renfro, Oregon (AFCA-2, NEA-2, UPI-3, Time)
Paul Warfield, Ohio State (Time)
Tommy Ford, Texas (FWAA, FN)
Tom Vaughn, Iowa State  (FWAA)
Benny Nelson, Alabama (NEA-2)
Cosmo Iacavazzi, Princeton (NEA-3, UPI-3)

Fullback
Jim Grisham, Oklahoma (CP, NEA-1, SN, UPI-2, FN)
Tommy Crutcher, TCU (AFCA-1, UPI-3)
 Tom Nowatzke, Indiana (FN)
 Tony Lorick, Arizona State (FN)
Tom Vaughn, Iowa State (AFCA-2)

Key

Official selectors

Other selectors

See also
 1963 All-Atlantic Coast Conference football team
 1963 All-Big Eight Conference football team
 1963 All-Big Ten Conference football team
 1963 All-Pacific Coast football team
 1963 All-SEC football team
 1963 All-Southwest Conference football team

References

All-America Team
College Football All-America Teams